The 2017 FIBA Women's AmeriCup was held in Buenos Aires, Argentina from 6 to 13 August 2017. It awarded three spots for FIBA Americas to the 2018 FIBA Women's Basketball World Cup in Spain.

Canada won their second straight title by defeating Argentina 67–65. Puerto Rico won their first ever medal after beating Brazil 75–68 in the third place game.

Venue

Qualification
 Host nation
  
 North America Subzone:
  (qualified automatically)
 Central America and Caribbean Subzone:
  (qualified automatically)
 Central America and Caribbean Subzone: 2017 Women's Centrobasket Championship
 
 
 
 South America Subzone: 2016 South American Basketball Championship for Women

Draw
The draw was held on 19 July 2017 in San Juan, Puerto Rico.

Squads

Preliminary round
All times are local (UTC−3).

Group A

Group B

Knockout stage

Bracket

Semifinals

Third place game

Final

Final standing

Statistics and awards

Statistical leaders

Points

Rebounds

Assists

Blocks

Steals

Awards

Most Valuable Player
  Nirra Fields

All-Tournament Team
  Melisa Gretter
  Nirra Fields
  Allison Gibson
  Paola Ferrari
  Miranda Ayim

References

External links
Official website

FIBA Women's AmeriCup
2017 in women's basketball
2017–18 in Argentine basketball
International women's basketball competitions hosted by Argentina
2017–18 in North American basketball
2017–18 in South American basketball
August 2017 sports events in South America
Qualification tournaments for the 2019 Pan American Games
2017